The sand slug, scientific name Philine aperta, is a species of predatory sea slug with an internal shell, a cephalaspid opisthobranch, or head-shield slug. It is a marine gastropod mollusc in the family Philinidae.

Distribution
This species can be found in the eastern Atlantic Ocean from northern Europe to southern Africa and is also found in the Pacific and Indian Oceans. It lives subtidally to several hundreds of metres underwater; in tropical waters it is found in deeper water.

Description
The sand slug is a sturdy, solid-bodied animal, white to cream in colour, with an internal shell and a folded appearance. It grows up to 100 mm in length.

Ecology
The sand slug is an active, sand-dwelling, predatory species; it eats small molluscs and worms which are swallowed whole, and then crushed in its gizzard. The animal secretes sulphuric acid to deter predators.

Its egg masses are translucent, sausage-shaped and are attached to sandy bottoms by long mucous threads.

References

Philinidae
Gastropods described in 1767
Taxa named by Carl Linnaeus